Colonel Brown Cambridge School is one of the oldest residential schools in Dehradun, Uttarakhand, India. It is an English medium school affiliated to the Indian Council of School Certificate Examination (CICSE) board of Education. Many of the buildings are heritage structures. The school is run by the N.S. Educational Society registered under the Societies Registration Act XXI of 1860 and is recognized for the purpose of sending up students for the I.C.S.E.

History
It was established in 1926 by Col. William Brown, an Irishman with a record of distinguished service both in the sphere of education and the British Army. After he retired from the army, Col. W.Brown did not wish to leave India, the country where he had served and which he had grown to love. He decided to devote his life to education. Thus, the school came into existence with Ms. Oliphant as its first principal..

Management 
The school is run by the "N.S. Educational Society" registered under the Societies Registration Act XXI of 1860 and is recognized for the purpose of sending up students for the I.C.S.E.

In 1975, Smt. Krishna Kumari, Sanjay Singh, Abhai Singh and Smt. Indu Bala Singh came into partnership to run the school. In 1978, two of the partners got a society registered in the name of N.S. Educational Society. This led to a court case by the other partners on the grounds that they had not been inculcated into the society.

Academics
The school is affiliated to the Council for the Indian School Certificate Examination, New Delhi. English is the medium of instruction in the school.

The school is divided into the Preparatory and the Senior School. 
The Preparatory school  classes are: II III, IV, V, VI and VII 
The Senior school classes are: VIII, IX, X, XI and XII
The Headmaster sees to the daily routine.
The Academic Session commences in April each year.

Sports and physical fitness
The following sports and games are offered:
Athletics
Cricket
Football
Gymnastics
Hockey
Badminton
Track and Field
Martial Arts
Swimming
Table Tennis
Lawn Tennis
Chess
Yoga

Social service and SUPW
Social awareness and service to the country is an integral part of education. Children are encouraged to help and work for the physically and mentally challenged. Voluntary contributions are made to Cancer Society of India, children suffering from Thallassemia, help Age and many other organisations.

The school has contributed to areas struck with disaster and natural calamities. SUPW grades are compulsory to secure a pass certificate in the Board Examinations.

Notable alumni
The students studying at CBS are also called Brownians and the ex students are called ex-Brownians or simply Old Boys. Colonel Brown Cambridge School has produced many prominent and notable persons which include the following:

General Agha Muhammad Yahya Khan – 3rd President of Pakistan and 5th Commander in Chief of the Pakistan army
Vishwanath Pratap Singh – Prime Minister Of India
Vijai Singh Shekhawat - Chief of Naval Staff of the Indian Navy
Raj Kapoor - Actor, film producer and director
Madan Mohan – Music Director
Hanut Singh - Lt. General of the Indian Army
Md Shamsul Hasan Khan – Member Of Parliament
Virbhadra Singh – 3 times former Chief Minister of Himachal Pradesh
Charanjit Singh - Two time Olympian and Gold medal winner 
Joy Mukherjee - Actor and Director

References

External links 
 
 Old Boys Association
 BSI

Boys' schools in India
Boarding schools in Uttarakhand
Schools in Dehradun
Educational institutions established in 1926
1926 establishments in India